Henry Brown is a film, television and stage actor whose career began in the early 1970s and continues to the present. With over sixty credits, he has appeared in over thirty films and thirty television shows. He quite often plays policemen and law enforcement officials. He played the main role in Carmen Madden's 2010 film, Everyday Black Man.

Background
In 1969, Brown came to UCSB with the intention of playing baseball. He graduated from there in 1971. One day while grabbing a quick meal, he accidentally spilt a glass of milk on Frank Silvera who happened to be a guest artist at UCSB at the time. Silvera introduced him to Dr. William R. Reardon. Brown was then recruited for the UCSB Touring Players. It was actually another guest artist Paul Winfield that introduced Brown to Stanley Kramer, and while still a student, Brown would land his first acting role in a Kramer film.

His film work includes My First Mister, Lethal Weapon 3. He has also had roles in The Man In The Glass Booth, Three the Hard Way, The Law, and Fireball Forward.  On television he has had a recurring role in Baywatch Nights. He has also appeared in Pickett Fences. Brown is also a stage actor and his stage work includes playing the part of Kofi Annan in David Hare's Iraq war drama Stuff Happens which also included Keith Carradine playing Bush and Julian Sands playing Blair. Other stage work includes playing the part Billy Lee  in The Ballad of Billy Lee. In addition to film, television and stage work, Brown has ventured into directing, and his directorial debut was music video “Nothing Sacred” by Mr. Way.

Career

1970s to 1980s
His earliest film work in the 1970 film, R. P. M. which was directed by Stanley Kramer. Along with Jose Brad and Frank Alesia, he played one of the students. A couple of years later, he played a wounded soldier in Marvin J Chomsky's Fireball Forward.
In the Richard Donner directed, 1973, made-for-television film, Stat! he played the part of Dr. Neil Patricks. Also that year he played the part of Abe Humes in the Kojak movie, The Marcus-Nelson Murders.
 In 1975, Brown starred in The Man In The Glass Booth, the Arthur Hiller-directed adaptation of Robert Shaw's stage play. The following year, in 1976, he appeared in the Douglas Hickox feature, Sky Riders which starred James Coburn, Susannah York and Robert Culp. In the "End Run"  episode of M*A*S*H in early 1977, Brown played Billy Tyler, a former college football star headed for the pros who loses a leg.

1990s to 2000s
In 1992, he appeared in two episodes of Matlock, as Reggie in "The Evening News, Part 1" and "The Evening News, Part 2".

In 2005, Their Eyes Were Watching God starring Halle Berry was released. He played the part of Water Stone.
He played Mr. Reid in Bill Duke's 2006 romantic comedy-drama Not Easily Broken.

He played the main role as Moses in Carmen Madden's award-winning, 2010 released film, Everyday Black Man where he plays local grocery store owner Moses.  Moses has been turned down for a loan from a bank and then becomes duped by a seemingly good man into letting his shop being used to sell drugs. Brown's performance was noted as "Down to a T" in a review by The other view.

Stage work (partial list)

Filmography

References

External links
 Imdb: Henry Brown
 Ultimatge70s.com: Henry Brown
 Noozhawk Article: Speaking of Stories to Present ‘Stories From The Twilight Zone’ March 13–14

20th-century American male actors
21st-century American male actors
African-American male actors
American male television actors
American male film actors
American male stage actors
20th-century African-American people
21st-century African-American people